The monarchy of Canada is Canada's form of government embodied by the Canadian sovereign and head of state. It is one of the key components of Canadian sovereignty and sits at the core of Canada's constitutional federal structure and Westminster-style parliamentary democracy. The monarchy is the foundation of the executive (King-in-Council), legislative (King-in-Parliament), and judicial (King-on-the-Bench) branches of both federal and provincial jurisdictions. The current king of Canada is Charles III, who has reigned since 8 September 2022.

Although the person of the sovereign is shared with 14 other independent countries within the Commonwealth of Nations, each country's monarchy is separate and legally distinct. As a result, the current monarch is officially titled King of Canada and, in this capacity, he and other members of the royal family undertake public and private functions domestically and abroad as representatives of Canada. However, the monarch is the only member of the royal family with any constitutional role. The monarch lives predominantly in the United Kingdom and, while several powers are the sovereign's alone, most of the royal governmental and ceremonial duties in Canada are carried out by the monarch's representative, the governor general of Canada. In Canada's provinces, the monarch in right of each is represented by a lieutenant governor. As territories fall under the federal jurisdiction, they each have a commissioner, rather than a lieutenant governor, who represents the federal Crown-in-Council directly.

As all executive authority is vested in the sovereign, royal assent is required to allow for bills to become law and for letters patent and orders-in-council to have legal effect. While the power for these acts stems from the Canadian people through the constitutional conventions of democracy, executive authority remains vested in the Crown and is only entrusted by the sovereign to the government on behalf of the people. This underlines the Crown's role in safeguarding the rights, freedoms, and democratic system of government of Canadians, reinforcing the fact that "governments are the servants of the people and not the reverse". Thus, within Canada's constitutional monarchy the sovereign's direct participation in any of these areas of governance is normally limited, with the sovereign typically exercising executive authority only with the advice and consent of the Cabinet of Canada, and the sovereign's legislative and judicial responsibilities largely carried out through the Parliament of Canada as well as judges and justices of the peace. There are, though, cases where the sovereign or their representative would have a duty to act directly and independently under the doctrine of necessity to prevent genuinely unconstitutional acts. In these respects, the sovereign and his viceroys are custodians of the Crown's reserve powers and represent the "power of the people above government and political parties". Put another way, the Crown functions as the guarantor of Canada's continuous and stable governance and as a nonpartisan safeguard against the abuse of power. Despite its pivotal constitutional functions, the monarchy remains widely misunderstood by not only the Canadian public, but also many politicians.

Canada is one of the oldest extant monarchies in the world. Established in the 16th century, the monarchy has evolved through a continuous succession of initially French and later British sovereigns into the independent Canadian sovereigns of today. The institution that is Canada's system of constitutional monarchy is sometimes colloquially referred to as the Maple Crown. There also exists in Canada a tradition of hereditary chieftainship in some First Nations, which predates the colonization of Canada and has been likened to monarchy.

International and domestic aspects

The person who is the Canadian sovereign is equally shared with 14 other monarchies (a grouping, including Canada, known informally as the Commonwealth realms) in the 56-member Commonwealth of Nations. The monarch resides predominantly in the oldest and most populous realm, the United Kingdom; viceroys (the governor general of Canada in the federal sphere and a lieutenant governor in each province) are the sovereign's representatives in Canada. The emergence of this arrangement paralleled the fruition of Canadian nationalism following the end of the First World War and culminated in the passage of the Statute of Westminster in 1931. Since then, the pan-national Crown has had both a shared and a separate character: the sovereign's role as monarch of Canada has been distinct from his or her position as monarch of any other realm, including the United Kingdom. Only Canadian federal ministers of the Crown may advise the sovereign on any and all matters of the Canadian state, of which the sovereign, when not in Canada, is kept abreast by weekly communications with the federal viceroy. The monarchy thus ceased to be an exclusively British institution and in Canada became a Canadian, or "domesticated", establishment, though it is still often denoted as "British" in both legal and common language, for reasons historical, political, and of convenience.

This division is illustrated in a number of ways: The sovereign, for example, holds a unique Canadian title and, when he and other members of the royal family are acting in public specifically as representatives of Canada, they use, where possible, Canadian symbols, including the country's national flag, unique royal symbols, armed forces uniforms, and the like, as well as Canadian Forces aircraft or other Canadian-owned vehicles for travel. Once in Canadian airspace, or arrived at a Canadian event taking place abroad, the Canadian Secretary to the King, officers of the Royal Canadian Mounted Police (RCMP), and other Canadian officials will take over from whichever of their other realms' counterparts were previously escorting the King or other member of the royal family.

The sovereign similarly only draws from Canadian funds for support in the performance of his duties when in Canada or acting as King of Canada abroad; Canadians do not pay any money to the King or any other member of the royal family, either towards personal income or to support royal residences outside of Canada.

Succession and regency

As in the other Commonwealth realms, the current heir apparent to the Canadian throne is William, Prince of Wales, who is followed in the line of succession by his eldest child, Prince George.

Demise of the Crown and accession
Upon the death of the monarch, there is a demise (transfer) of the Crown: the late sovereign's heir immediately and automatically succeeds; hence arises the phrase, "the King is dead. Long live the King". there has been no interregnum between the death of one king or queen and the accession of the next since at least the reign of Edward I, 225 years before John Cabot landed on the east coast of what is today Canada. No confirmation or further ceremony is necessary; the federal Cabinet and civil service will, though, follow the Manual of Official Procedure of the Government of Canada in carrying out various formalities around the late monarch's death and the new monarch's assumption of the throne.

It has been customary for the accession to be publicly proclaimed by the governor general-in-council, who meet at Rideau Hall immediately upon the previous monarch's death. Since Edward VIII took the throne in 1936, it has been "constitutionally inappropriate" for Canada's accession proclamations to be approved by a British order-in-council, as the monarch has, since then, assumed the Canadian throne according to Canadian law. For the accession of Charles III, the first since the creation of the Canadian Heraldic Authority in 1989, the Chief Herald read the royal proclamation aloud. If Parliament is in session, the Prime Minister will announce the demise of the Crown there and move for a joint address of sympathy and loyalty to the new monarch.

An appropriate period of mourning also follows, during which portraits of the recently deceased monarch are draped with black fabric and staff at government houses wear customary black armbands. The Manual of Official Procedure of the Government of Canada states the prime minister is responsible for convening parliament, tabling a resolution of loyalty and condolence from parliament to the new monarch, and arranging for the motion to be seconded by the leader of the official opposition. The prime minister will then move to adjourn parliament. The Canadian Broadcasting Corporation keeps a regularly updated plan for a "broadcast of national importance", announcing the demise of a sovereign and covering the aftermath, during which all regular programming and advertising is cancelled and on-call commentators contribute to a 24-hour news mode. As the late sovereign is typically buried in the UK, the federal and provincial governments will organize commemoration ceremonies, involving religious services, eulogies, and military parades. Such ceremonies may also be held for other recently deceased members of the royal family. The day of the sovereign's funeral is likely to be a public holiday.

The new monarch is crowned in the United Kingdom in an ancient ritual, but one not necessary for a sovereign to reign. Under the federal Interpretation Act, officials who hold a federal office under the Crown are not affected by the death of the monarch, nor are they required to take the Oath of Allegiance again. All references in federal legislation to previous monarchs, whether in the masculine (e.g. his majesty) or feminine (e.g. the queen), continue to mean the reigning sovereign of Canada, regardless of his or her gender. This is because, in common law, the Crown never dies. After an individual accedes to the throne, he or she usually continues to reign until death.

Legal aspects of succession

The relationship between the Commonwealth realms is such that any change to the rules of succession to their respective crowns requires the unanimous consent of all the realms. Succession is governed by statutes, such as the Bill of Rights 1689, the Act of Settlement, 1701, and the Acts of Union, 1707.

King Edward VIII abdicated in 1936 and any possible future descendants of his were excluded from the line of succession. The British government at the time, wishing for speed so as to avoid embarrassing debate in Dominion parliaments, suggested that the governments of the Dominions of the British Commonwealth—then Australia, New Zealand, the Irish Free State, the Union of South Africa, and Canada—regard whoever was monarch of the UK to automatically be monarch of their respective Dominion. As with the other Dominion governments, the Canadian Cabinet, headed by Prime Minister William Lyon Mackenzie King, refused to accept the idea and stressed that the laws of succession were part of Canadian law and, as the Statute of Westminster 1931 disallowed the UK from legislating for Canada, including in relation to succession, altering them required Canada's request and consent to the British legislation (His Majesty's Declaration of Abdication Act 1936) becoming part of Canadian law. Sir Maurice Gwyer, first parliamentary counsel in the UK, reflected this position, stating the Act of Settlement was a part of the law in each Dominion. Thus, Order-in-Council P.C. 3144 was issued, expressing the Cabinet's request and consent for His Majesty's Declaration of Abdication Act, 1936, to become part of the laws of Canada and the Succession to the Throne Act, 1937, gave parliamentary ratification to that action, together bringing the Act of Settlement and Royal Marriages Act 1772 into Canadian law. The latter was deemed by the Cabinet in 1947 to be part of Canadian law. The Department of External Affairs included all succession-related laws in its list of acts within Canadian law.

The Supreme Court of Canada declared unanimously in the 1981 Patriation Reference that the Bill of Rights 1689 is "undoubtedly in force as part of the law of Canada". Furthermore, in O'Donohue v. Canada (2003) the Ontario Superior Court of Justice found that the Act of Settlement, 1701, is "part of the laws of Canada" and the rules of succession are "by necessity incorporated into the Constitution of Canada". Another ruling of the Ontario Superior Court, in 2014, echoed the 2003 case, stating that the Act of Settlement "is an imperial statute which ultimately became part of the law of Canada." Upon dismissing appeal of that case, the Court of Appeal of Ontario stated "[t]he rules of succession are a part of the fabric of the constitution of Canada and incorporated into it".

In a meeting of the Special Joint Committee on the Constitution during the process of patriating the Canadian constitution in 1981, John Munro asked then-Minister of Justice Jean Chrétien about the "selective omissions" of the Succession to the Throne Act, 1937, the Demise of the Crown Act 1901, the Seals Act, the Governor General's Act, and the Royal Style and Titles Act, 1953, from the schedule to the Constitution Act, 1982. In response, Chrétien asserted that the schedule to the Constitution Act, 1982, was not exhaustive, outlining that section 52(2) of the Constitution Act, 1982, says "[t]he Constitution of Canada includes [...] the Acts and orders referred to the schedule" and "[w]hen you use the word 'includes' [...] it means that if ever there is another thing related to the Canadian constitution as part of it, should have been there, or might have been there, it is covered. So we do not have to renumerate [sic] the ones that you are mentioning." In the same meeting, Deputy Attorney General Barry Strayer stated: "Clause 52(2) is not an exhaustive definition of the Constitution of Canada so that while we have certain things listed in the schedule which are clearly part of the constitution, that does not mean that there are not other things which are part of the constitution... [The schedule] is not an exhaustive list."

Leslie Zines claimed in the 1991 publication, Constitutional Change in the Commonwealth,  that, though the succession to Canada's throne was outlined by common law and the Act of Settlement, 1701, these were not part of the Canadian constitution, which "does not contain rules for succession to the throne." Richard Toporoski, writing three years later for the Monarchist League of Canada, stated, "there is no existing provision in our law, other than the Act of Settlement, 1701, that provides that the King or Queen of Canada shall be the same person as the King or Queen of the United Kingdom. If the British law were to be changed and we did not change our law [...] the person provided for in the new law would become king or queen in at least some realms of the Commonwealth; Canada would continue on with the person who would have become monarch under the previous law."

Canada, with the other Commonwealth realms, committed to the 2011 Perth Agreement, which proposed changes to the rules governing succession to remove male preference and removal of disqualification arising from marriage to a Roman Catholic. As a result of the Perth Agreement, the Canadian parliament passed the Succession to the Throne Act, 2013, which gave the country's assent to the Succession to the Crown Bill, at that time proceeding in the Parliament of the United Kingdom. In dismissing a challenge to the law on the basis that a change to the succession in Canada would require unanimous consent of all provinces under section 41(a) of the Constitution Act, 1982, Quebec Superior Court Justice Claude Bouchard ruled that Canada "did not have to change its laws nor its constitution for the British royal succession rules to be amended and effective" and constitutional convention committed Canada to having a line of succession symmetrical to those of other Commonwealth realms. The ruling was upheld by the Quebec Court of Appeal. The Supreme Court of Canada declined to hear an appeal in April 2020.

Constitutional scholar Philippe Lagassé argues that, in light of the Succession to the Throne Act, 2013, and court rulings upholding that law, section 41(a) of the Constitution Act, 1982, which requires a constitutional amendment passed with the unanimous consent of the provinces, applies only to the "office of the Queen", but not who holds that office, and that therefore "ending the principle of symmetry with the United Kingdom can be done with the general amending procedure, or even by parliament alone under section 44 of the Constitution Act, 1982."

Ted McWhinney, another constitutional scholar, argued that a then-future government of Canada could begin a process of phasing out the monarchy after the death of Elizabeth II "quietly and without fanfare by simply failing legally to proclaim any successor to the Queen in relation to Canada". This would, he claimed, be a way of bypassing the need for a constitutional amendment that would require unanimous consent by the federal parliament and all the provincial legislatures. However, Ian Holloway, Dean of Law at the University of Western Ontario, criticized McWhinney's proposal for its ignorance of provincial input and opined that its implementation "would be contrary to the plain purpose of those who framed our system of government."

Certain aspects of the succession rules have been challenged in the courts. For example, under the provisions of the Bill of Rights 1689 and the Act of Settlement, 1701, Catholics are barred from succeeding to the throne; this prohibition has been upheld twice by Canadian courts, once in 2003 and again in 2014.

Regency

Canada has no laws allowing for a regency, should the sovereign be a minor or debilitated; none have been passed by the Canadian parliament and it was made clear by successive cabinets since 1937 that the United Kingdom's Regency Act had no applicability to Canada, as the Canadian Cabinet had not requested otherwise when the act was passed that year and again in 1943 and 1953. As the Letters Patent, 1947, issued by King George VI permit the governor general of Canada to exercise almost all of the monarch's powers in respect of Canada, the viceroy is expected to continue to act as the personal representative of the monarch, and not any regent, even if the monarch is a child or incapacitated. Lagassé states that the 1947 letters patent were apparently written to avoid the need for a Canadian regency act and "appear to give governors general the power to appoint their own successors", though this is a power that has not been utilized to date.

Foreign visits

The following state and official visits to foreign countries have been made by the monarch as the sovereign of Canada:

Federal and provincial aspects

The origins of Canada's sovereignty lie in the early 17th century, during which time the monarch in England fought with parliament there over who had ultimate authority, culminating in the Glorious Revolution in 1688 and the subsequent Bill of Rights, 1689, which, as mentioned elsewhere in this article, is today part of Canadian constitutional law. This brought to Canada the British notion of the supremacy of parliament—of which the monarch is a part—and it was carried into each of the provinces upon their establishment. That, however, was superseded when the Charter of Rights and Freedoms (within the Constitution Act, 1982) introduced into Canada the American idea of the the supremacy of the law. Still, the King remains the sovereign of Canada.

Canada's monarchy was established at Confederation, when its executive government and authority were declared, in section 9 of the Constitution Act, 1867, to continue and be vested in the monarch. Although Canada is a federation, the Canadian monarchy is unitary throughout all jurisdictions in the country, the sovereignty of the different administrations being passed on through the overreaching Crown itself as a part of the executive, legislative, and judicial operations in each of the federal and provincial spheres and the headship of state being a part of all equally. The Crown thus links the various governments into a federal state, though it is simultaneously also "divided" into eleven legal jurisdictions, or eleven "crowns"—one federal and ten provincial—with the monarch taking on a distinct legal persona in each. As such, the constitution instructs that any change to the position of the monarch or his or her representatives in Canada requires the consent of the Senate, the House of Commons, and the legislative assemblies of all the provinces.

The governor general is appointed by the monarch on the advice of his federal prime minister and the lieutenant governors are appointed by the governor general on the advice of the federal prime minister. The commissioners of Canada's territories are appointed by the federal Governor-in-Council, at the recommendation of the minister of Indian affairs and northern development; but, as the territories are not sovereign entities, the commissioners are not personal representatives of the sovereign. The Advisory Committee on Vice-Regal Appointments, which may seek input from the relevant premier and provincial or territorial community, proposes candidates for appointment as governor general, lieutenant governor, and commissioner.

Sovereign immunity
It has been held since 1918 that the federal Crown is immune from provincial law. Constitutional convention has also held that the Crown in right of each province is outside the jurisdiction of the courts in other provinces. This view, however, has been questioned.

Lieutenant governors do not enjoy the same immunity as the sovereign in matters not relating to the powers of the viceregal office, as decided in the case of former Lieutenant Governor of Quebec Lise Thibault, who had been accused of misappropriating public funds.

Personification of the Canadian state

As the living embodiment of the Crown, the sovereign is regarded as the personification of the Canadian state and, as such, must, along with his or her viceregal representatives, "remain strictly neutral in political terms". The person of the reigning sovereign thus holds two distinct personas in constant coexistence: that of a natural-born human being and that of the state as accorded to him or her through law; the Crown and the monarch are "conceptually divisible but legally indivisible [...] The office cannot exist without the office-holder", so, even in private, the monarch is always "on duty". The terms the state, the Crown, the Crown in Right of Canada, His Majesty the King in Right of Canada, and similar are all synonymous and the monarch's legal personality is sometimes referred to simply as Canada.

As such, the king or queen of Canada is the employer of all government officials and staff (including the viceroys, judges, members of the Canadian Forces, police officers, and parliamentarians), the guardian of foster children (Crown wards), as well as the owner of all state lands (Crown land), buildings and equipment (Crown held property), state owned companies (Crown corporations), and the copyright for all government publications (Crown copyright). This is all in his or her position as sovereign, and not as an individual; all such property is held by the Crown in perpetuity and cannot be sold by the sovereign without the proper advice and consent of his or her ministers.

The monarch is at the apex of the Canadian order of precedence and, as the embodiment of the state, is also the focus of oaths of allegiance, required of many of the aforementioned employees of the Crown, as well as by new citizens, as by the Oath of Citizenship. Allegiance is given in reciprocation to the sovereign's Coronation Oath, wherein he or she promises "to govern the Peoples of [...] Canada [...] according to their respective laws and customs".

Head of state
Although it has been argued that the term head of state is a republican one inapplicable in a constitutional monarchy such as Canada, where the monarch is the embodiment of the state and thus cannot be head of it, the sovereign is regarded by official government sources, judges, constitutional scholars, and pollsters as the head of state, while the governor general and lieutenant governors are all only representatives of, and thus equally subordinate to, that figure. Still others view the role of head of state as being shared by both the sovereign and her viceroys. Since 1927, governors general have been received on state visits abroad as though they were heads of state.

Officials at Rideau Hall have attempted to use the Letters Patent, 1947, as justification for describing the governor general as head of state. However, the document makes no such distinction, nor does it effect an abdication of the sovereign's powers in favour of the viceroy, as it only allows the governor general to "act on The Queen's behalf". Dr D. Michael Jackson, former Chief of Protocol of Saskatchewan, argued that Rideau Hall had been attempting to "recast" the governor general as head of state since the 1970s and doing so preempted both the Queen and all of the lieutenant governors. This caused not only "precedence wars" at provincial events (where the governor general usurped the lieutenant governor's proper spot as most senior official in attendance) and Governor General Adrienne Clarkson to accord herself precedence before the Queen at a national occasion, but also constitutional issues by "unbalancing [...] the federalist symmetry". This has been regarded as both a natural evolution and as a dishonest effort to alter the constitution without public scrutiny.

In a poll conducted by Ipsos-Reid following the first prorogation of the 40th parliament on 4 December 2008, it was found that 42 per cent of the sample group thought the prime minister was head of state, while 33 per cent felt it was the governor general. Only 24 per cent named the Queen as head of state, a number up from 2002, when the results of an EKOS Research Associates survey showed only 5 per cent of those polled knew the Queen was head of state (69 per cent answered that it was the prime minister).

Federal constitutional role
Canada's constitution is based on the Westminster parliamentary model, wherein the role of the King is both legal and practical, but not political. The sovereign is vested with all the powers of state, collectively known as the royal prerogative, leading the populace to be considered subjects of the Crown. However, as the sovereign's power stems from the people and the monarch is a constitutional one, he or she does not rule alone, as in an absolute monarchy. Instead, the Crown is regarded as a corporation sole, with the monarch being the centre of a construct in which the power of the whole is shared by multiple institutions of government—the executive, legislative, and judicial—acting under the sovereign's authority, which is entrusted for exercise by the politicians (the elected and appointed parliamentarians and the ministers of the Crown generally drawn from among them) and the judges and justices of the peace. The monarchy has thus been described as the underlying principle of Canada's institutional unity and the monarch as a "guardian of constitutional freedoms" whose "job is to ensure that the political process remains intact and is allowed to function."

The Great Seal of Canada "signifies the power and authority of the Crown flowing from the sovereign to [the] parliamentary government" and is applied to state documents such as royal proclamations and letters patent commissioning Cabinet ministers, senators, judges, and other senior government officials. The "lending" of royal authority to Cabinet is illustrated by the great seal being entrusted by the governor general, the official keeper of the seal, to the minister of innovation, science, and economic development, who is ex officio the registrar general of Canada. Upon a change of government, the seal is temporarily returned to the governor general and then "lent" to the next incoming registrar general.

The Crown is the pinnacle of the Canadian Armed Forces, with the constitution placing the monarch in the position of commander-in-chief of the entire force, though the governor general carries out the duties attached to the position and also bears the title of Commander-in-Chief in and over Canada.

Executive (King-in-Council)

The government of Canada—formally termed His Majesty's Government—is defined by the constitution as the King acting on the advice of his Privy Council; what is technically known as the King-in-Council, or sometimes the Governor-in-Council, referring to the governor general as the King's stand-in, though, a few tasks must be specifically performed by, or bills that require assent from, the King. One of the main duties of the Crown is to "ensure that a democratically elected government is always in place," which means appointing a prime minister to thereafter head the Cabinet—a committee of the Privy Council charged with advising the Crown on the exercise of the royal prerogative. The monarch is informed by his viceroy of the swearing-in and resignation of prime ministers and other members of the ministry, remains fully briefed through regular communications from his Canadian ministers, and holds audience with them whenever possible. By convention, the content of these communications and meetings remains confidential so as to protect the impartiality of the monarch and his representative. The appropriateness and viability of this tradition in an age of social media has been questioned.

In the construct of constitutional monarchy and responsible government, the ministerial advice tendered is typically binding, meaning the monarch reigns but does not rule, the Cabinet ruling "in trust" for the monarch. This has been the case in Canada since the Treaty of Paris ended the reign of the territory's last absolute monarch, King Louis XV of France. However, the royal prerogative belongs to the Crown and not to any of the ministers and the royal and viceroyal figures may unilaterally use these powers in exceptional constitutional crisis situations (an exercise of the reserve powers), thereby allowing the monarch to make sure "that the government conducts itself in compliance with the constitution." Use of the royal prerogative in this manner was seen when the governor general refused his prime minister's advice to dissolve Parliament in 1926 and when, in 2008, the governor general took some hours to decide whether or not to accept her prime minister's advice to prorogue Parliament to avoid a vote of non-confidence. The prerogative powers have also been used numerous times in the provinces.

The royal prerogative further extends to foreign affairs, including the ratification of treaties, alliances, international agreements, and declarations of war, the accreditation of Canadian high commissioners and ambassadors and receipt of similar diplomats from foreign states, and the issuance of Canadian passports, which remain the sovereign's property. It also includes the creation of dynastic and national honours, though only the latter are established on official ministerial advice.

Parliament (King-in-Parliament)

All laws in Canada are the monarch's and the sovereign is one of the three components of the Parliament of Canada—formally called the King-in-Parliament—but the monarch and viceroy do not participate in the legislative process save for royal assent, which is necessary for a bill to be enacted as law. Either figure or a delegate may perform this task and the constitution allows the viceroy the option of deferring assent to the sovereign. The governor general is further responsible for summoning the House of Commons, while either the viceroy or monarch can prorogue and dissolve the legislature, after which the governor general usually calls for a general election. The new parliamentary session is marked by either the monarch, governor general, or some other representative reading the Speech from the Throne. Members of Parliament must recite the Oath of Allegiance before they may take their seat. Further, the official opposition is traditionally dubbed as His Majesty's Loyal Opposition, illustrating that, while its members are opposed to the incumbent government, they remain loyal to the sovereign (as personification of the state and its authority).

The monarch does not have the prerogative to impose and collect new taxes without the authorization of an act of Parliament. The consent of the Crown must, however, be obtained before either of the houses of Parliament may even debate a bill affecting the sovereign's prerogatives or interests and no act of Parliament binds the King or his rights unless the act states that it does.

Courts (King-on-the-Bench)

The sovereign is responsible for rendering justice for all his subjects and is thus traditionally deemed the fount of justice and his position in the Canadian courts formally dubbed the King on the Bench. The Arms of His Majesty in Right of Canada are traditionally displayed in Canadian courtrooms, as is a portrait of the sovereign.

The monarch does not personally rule in judicial cases; this function of the royal prerogative is instead performed in trust and in the King's name by officers of His Majesty's court. Common law holds the notion that the sovereign "can do no wrong": the monarch cannot be prosecuted in his own courts—judged by himself—for criminal offences under his own laws. Canada inherited the common law version of Crown immunity from British law. However, over time, the scope of said immunity has been steadily reduced by statute law. With the passage of relevant legislation through the provincial and federal parliaments, the Crown in its public capacity (that is, lawsuits against the King-in-Council), in all areas of Canada, is now liable in tort, as any normal person would be; civil lawsuits against the Crown are permitted, but lawsuits against the monarch personally are not cognizable. In international cases, as a sovereign and under established principles of international law, the King of Canada is not subject to suit in foreign courts without his express consent.

Within the royal prerogative is also the granting of immunity from prosecution, mercy, and pardoning offences against the Crown. Since 1878, the prerogative of pardon has always been exercised upon the recommendation of ministers.

The Crown and indigenous peoples

Included in Canada's constitution are the various treaties between the Crown and Canada's First Nations, Inuit, and Métis peoples, who, like the Māori and the Treaty of Waitangi in New Zealand, generally view the affiliation as being not between them and the ever-changing Cabinet, but instead with the continuous Crown of Canada, as embodied in the reigning sovereign, meaning the link between monarch and indigenous peoples in Canada will theoretically last for "as long as the sun shines, grass grows, and rivers flow."

The association stretches back to the first decisions between North American indigenous peoples and European colonialists and, over centuries of interface, treaties were established concerning the monarch and indigenous nations. The only treaties that survived the American Revolution are those in Canada, which date to the beginning of the 18th century. Today, the main guide for relations between the monarchy and Canadian First Nations is King George III's Royal Proclamation of 1763; while not a treaty, it is regarded by First Nations as their Magna Carta or "Indian Bill of Rights", as it affirmed native title to their lands and made clear that, though under the sovereignty of the Crown, the aboriginal bands were autonomous political units in a "nation-to-nation" association with non-native governments, with the monarch as the intermediary. The agreements with the Crown are administered by aboriginal law and overseen by the minister of Crown-indigenous relations.

The link between the Crown and indigenous peoples will sometimes be symbolically expressed through ceremony. Gifts have been frequently exchanged and aboriginal titles have been bestowed upon royal and viceregal figures since the early days of indigenous contact with the Crown. As far back as 1710, indigenous leaders have met to discuss treaty business with royal family members or viceroys in private audience and many continue to use their connection to the Crown to further their political aims; public ceremonies attended by the monarch or another member of the royal family have been employed as a platform on which to present complaints, witnessed by both national and international cameras. Following country-wide protests, beginning in 2012, and the close of the Truth and Reconciliation Commission in 2015, focus turned toward rapprochement between the nations in the nation-to-nation relationship.

Hereditary chiefs

The hereditary chiefs are leaders within First Nations who represent different houses or clans and whose chieftaincies are passed down intergenerationally; most First Nations have a hereditary system. The positions are rooted in traditional models of Indigenous governance that predate the colonization of Canada and are organized in a fashion similar to the occidental idea of monarchy. Indeed, early European explorers often considered territories belonging to different aboriginal groups to be kingdoms—such as along the north shore of the St. Lawrence River, between the Trinity River and the Isle-aux-Coudres, and the neighbouring "kingdom of Canada", which stretched west to the Island of Montreal—and the leaders of these communities were referred to as kings, particularly those chosen through heredity.

Today, the hereditary chiefs are not sovereign; according to the Supreme Court of Canada, the Crown holds sovereignty over the whole of Canada, including reservation and traditional lands. However, by some interpretations of case law from the same court, the chiefs have jurisdiction over traditional territories that fall outside of band-controlled reservation land, beyond the elected band councils established by the Indian Act. Although recognized by, and accountable to, the federal Crown-in-Council (the Government of Canada), band chiefs do not hold the cultural authority of hereditary chiefs, who often serve as knowledge-keepers, responsible for the upholding of a First Nation's traditional customs, legal systems, and cultural practices.

Cultural role

Royal presence and duties

Members of the royal family have been present in Canada since the late 18th century, their reasons including participating in military manoeuvres, serving as the federal viceroy, or undertaking official royal tours. A prominent feature of the latter are numerous royal walkabouts, the tradition of which was initiated in 1939 by Queen Elizabeth when she was in Ottawa and broke from the royal party to speak directly to gathered veterans. Usually important milestones, anniversaries, or celebrations of Canadian culture will warrant the presence of the monarch, while other royals will be asked to participate in lesser occasions. A household to assist and tend to the monarch forms part of the royal party.

Official duties involve the sovereign representing the Canadian state at home or abroad, or her relations as members of the royal family participating in government organized ceremonies either in Canada or elsewhere; sometimes these individuals are employed in asserting Canada's sovereignty over its territories. The advice of the Canadian Cabinet is the impetus for royal participation in any Canadian event, though, at present, the Chief of Protocol and his staff in the Department of Canadian Heritage are, as part of the State Ceremonial and Canadian Symbols Program, responsible for orchestrating any official events in or for Canada that involve the royal family.

Conversely, unofficial duties are performed by royal family members on behalf of Canadian organizations of which they may be patrons, through their attendance at charity events, visiting with members of the Canadian Forces as colonel-in-chief, or marking certain key anniversaries. The invitation and expenses associated with these undertakings are usually borne by the associated organization. In 2005 members of the royal family were present at a total of 76 Canadian engagements, as well as several more through 2006 and 2007.

Apart from Canada, the King and other members of the royal family regularly perform public duties in the other fourteen Commonwealth realms in which the King is head of state. This situation, however, can mean the monarch and/or members of the royal family will be promoting one nation and not another; a situation that has been met with criticism.

Symbols, associations, and awards

The main symbol of the monarchy is the sovereign himself, described as "the personal expression of the Crown in Canada," and his image is thus used to signify Canadian sovereignty and government authority—his image, for instance, appearing on currency, and his portrait in government buildings. The sovereign is further both mentioned in and the subject of songs, loyal toasts, and salutes. A royal cypher, appearing on buildings and official seals, or a crown, seen on provincial and national coats of arms, as well as police force and Canadian Forces regimental and maritime badges and rank insignia, is also used to illustrate the monarchy as the locus of authority, the latter without referring to any specific monarch.

Since the days of King Louis XIV, the monarch is the fount of all honours in Canada and the orders, decorations, and medals form "an integral element of the Crown." Hence, the insignia and medallions for these awards bear a crown, cypher, and/or portrait of the monarch. Similarly, the country's heraldic authority was created by the Queen and, operating under the authority of the governor general, grants new coats of arms, flags, and badges in Canada. Use of the royal crown in such symbols is a gift from the monarch showing royal support and/or association, and requires her approval before being added.

Members of the royal family also act as ceremonial colonels-in-chief, commodores-in-chief, captains-general, air commodores-in-chief, generals, and admirals of various elements of the Canadian Forces, reflecting the Crown's relationship with the country's military through participation in events both at home and abroad. The monarch also serves as the Commissioner-in-Chief, Prince Charles as Honorary Commissioner, and Prince Edward as Honorary Deputy Commissioner of the Royal Canadian Mounted Police.

A number of Canadian civilian organizations have association with the monarchy, either through their being founded via a royal charter, having been granted the right to use the prefix royal before their name, or because at least one member of the royal family serves as a patron. In addition to The Prince's Charities Canada, established by Charles, Prince of Wales, some other charities and volunteer organizations have also been founded as gifts to, or in honour of, some of Canada's monarchs or members of the royal family, such as the Victorian Order of Nurses (a gift to Queen Victoria for her Diamond Jubilee in 1897), the Canadian Cancer Fund (set up in honour of King George V's Silver Jubilee in 1935), and the Queen Elizabeth II Fund to Aid in Research on the Diseases of Children. A number of awards in Canada are likewise issued in the name of previous or present members of the royal family. Further, organizations will give commemorative gifts to members of the royal family to mark a visit or other important occasion. All Canadian coins bear the image of the monarch reigning at the time of the coin's production, with an inscription, Dei Gratia Rex (often abbreviated to DG Rex), a Latin phrase translated to English as, "by the grace of god, king". During the reign of a female monarch, rex is replaced with regina, which is Latin for queen.

Significance to Canadian identity
In his 1990 book, Continental Divide: the Values and Institutions of the United States and Canada, Seymour Martin Lipset argues that the presence of the monarchy in Canada helps distinguish Canadian identity from American identity. Since at least the 1930s, supporters of the Crown have held the opinion that the Canadian monarch is also one of the rare unified elements of Canadian society, focusing both "the historic consciousness of the nation" and various forms of patriotism and national love "[on] the point around which coheres the nation's sense of a continuing personality". Former Governor General Vincent Massey articulated in 1967 that the monarchy "is part of ourselves. It is linked in a very special way with our national life. It stands for qualities and institutions which mean Canada to every one of us and which for all our differences and all our variety have kept Canada Canadian." 

But, according to Arthur Bousfield and Gary Toffoli, Canadians were, through the late 1960s to the 2000s, encouraged by the federal government to "neglect, ignore, forget, reject, debase, suppress, even hate, and certainly treat as foreign what their parents and grandparents, whether spiritual or blood, regarded as the basis of Canadian nationhood, autonomy, and history", including the monarchy. Former Governor General Roland Michener said in 1970 that anti-monarchists claimed the Canadian Crown is foreign and incompatible with Canada's multicultural society, which the government promoted as a Canadian identifier, and Lawrence Martin called in 2007 for Canada to become a republic in order to "re-brand the nation". However, Michener also stated, "[the monarchy] is our own by inheritance and choice, and contributes much to our distinctive Canadian identity and our chances of independent survival amongst the republics of North and South America." Journalist Christina Blizzard emphasized in 2009 that the monarchy "made [Canada] a haven of peace and justice for immigrants from around the world", while Michael Valpy contended in 2009 that the Crown's nature permitted non-conformity amongst its subjects, thereby opening the door to multiculturalism and pluralism.

Royal family and house

The Canadian royal family is the group of people who are relatively closely related to the country's monarch and, as such, belonging to the House of Windsor. There is no legal definition of who is or is not a member of the royal family, though the Government of Canada maintains a list of immediate family members, and stipulates that those in the direct line of succession who bear the style of royal highness are subjects of, and owe their allegiance specifically to, the reigning king or queen of Canada. Unlike in the United Kingdom, the monarch is the only member of the royal family with a title established through Canadian law and is styled by convention as his/her majesty, as would be a queen consort. Otherwise, the remaining family members are, as a courtesy, styled and titled as they are in the UK, according to letters patent issued there. Though, in Canada, these are also translated to French.

They are distant relations of the Belgian, Danish, Greek, Norwegian, Spanish, and Swedish royal families and, given the shared nature of the Canadian monarch, most are also of members of the British royal family. However, because Canada and the UK are independent of one another, it is inappropriate to refer in the Canadian context to the family of the monarch as the "British royal family"—as is frequently done by Canadian and other media—and there exist some differences between the official lists of each. Further, in addition to the five Canadian citizens in the royal family, the sovereign is considered Canadian, and those among his relations who do not meet the requirements of Canadian citizenship law are considered Canadian, which entitles them to Canadian consular assistance and the protection of the King's armed forces of Canada when they are in need of protection or aid outside of the Commonwealth realms, as well as to substantive appointment to Canadian orders or receipt of Canadian decorations. Beyond legalities, members of the royal family have, on occasion, been said by the media and non-governmental organizations to be Canadian, have declared themselves to be Canadian, and some past members have lived in Canada for extended periods as viceroy or for other reasons.

According to the Canadian Royal Heritage Trust, Prince Edward Augustus, Duke of Kent and Strathearn—due to his having lived in Canada between 1791 and 1800, and fathering Queen Victoria—is the "ancestor of the modern Canadian Royal Family". Nonetheless, the concept of the Canadian royal family did not emerge until after the passage of the Statute of Westminster in 1931, when Canadian officials only began to overtly consider putting the principles of Canada's new status as an independent kingdom into effect. At first, the monarch was the only member of the royal family to carry out public ceremonial duties solely on the advice of Canadian ministers; King Edward VIII became the first to do so when in July 1936 he dedicated the Canadian National Vimy Memorial in France. Over the decades, however, the monarch's children, grandchildren, cousins, and their respective spouses began to also perform functions at the direction of the Canadian Crown-in-Council, representing the monarch within Canada or abroad.

However, it was not until October 2002 when the term Canadian royal family was first used publicly and officially by one of its members: in a speech to the Nunavut legislature at its opening, Queen Elizabeth II stated: "I am proud to be the first member of the Canadian royal family to be greeted in Canada's newest territory." Princess Anne used it again when speaking at Rideau Hall in 2014, as did the now King Charles in Halifax the same year. Also in 2014, then-Premier of Saskatchewan Brad Wall called Prince Edward a member of the Canadian royal family. By 2011, both Canadian and British media were referring to "Canada's royal family" or the "Canadian royal family".

Federal residences and royal household

A number of buildings across Canada are reserved by the Crown for the use of the monarch and his viceroys. Each is called Government House, but may be customarily known by some specific name. The sovereign's and governor general's official residences are Rideau Hall in Ottawa and the Citadelle in Quebec City. Each of these royal seats holds pieces from the Crown Collection. Further, though neither was ever used for their intended purpose, Hatley Castle in British Columbia was purchased in 1940 by King George VI in Right of Canada to use as his home during the course of the Second World War and the Emergency Government Headquarters, built in 1959 at CFS Carp and decommissioned in 1994, included a residential apartment for the sovereign or governor general in the case of a nuclear attack on Ottawa.

Monarchs and members of their family have also owned in a private capacity homes and land in Canada: King Edward VIII owned Bedingfield Ranch, near Pekisko, Alberta; the Marquess of Lorne and Princess Louise owned a cottage on the Cascapédia River in Quebec; and Princess Margaret owned Portland Island between its gifting to her by the Crown in Right of British Columbia in 1958 and her death in 2002, though she offered it back to the Crown on permanent loan in 1966 and the island and surrounding waters eventually became Princess Margaret Marine Park.

To assist the King in carrying out his official duties on behalf of Canada, he appoints various people to his Canadian household. Along with the Canadian Secretary to the King, the monarch's entourage includes two ladies-in-waiting, the Canadian Equerry-in-Waiting to the King, the King's Police Officer, the King's Honorary Physician, the King's Honorary Dental Surgeon, and the King's Honorary Nursing Officer—the latter three being drawn from the Canadian Forces. Prince Edward, Duke of Edinburgh, also has a Canadian private secretary and his wife, Sophie, Duchess of Edinburgh, a lady-in-waiting. Air transportation for the royal family is provided by the Royal Canadian Air Force 412 Transport Squadron.

There are three household regiments specifically attached to the royal household—the Governor General's Foot Guards, the Governor General's Horse Guards, and the Canadian Grenadier Guards. There are also three chapels royal, all in Ontario: Mohawk Chapel in Brantford; Christ Church Royal Chapel, near Deseronto; and St Catherine's Chapel in Massey College, in Toronto. Though not officially a royal chapel, St Bartholomew's Anglican Church, located across MacKay Street from Rideau Hall, is regularly used by governors general and their families and sometimes by the sovereign and other members of the royal family, as well as by viceregal household staff, their families, and members of the Governor General's Foot Guards, for whom the church also serves as a regimental chapel.

Security

The Royal Canadian Mounted Police is tasked with providing security to the sovereign, the governor general (starting from when he or she is made governor general-designate), and other members of the royal family; as outlined in the RCMP Regulations, the force "has a duty to protect individuals designated by the minister of public safety, including certain members of the royal family when visiting." The RCMP's provision of service is determined based on threat and risk assessment, the seniority of the individual in terms of precedence, and, for members of the royal family, the nature of the royal tour—ie an official tour on behalf of the King or a working or private visit. The governor general receives round-the-clock security from the Governor General Protection Detail, part of the Personal Protection Group, based at Rideau Hall.

History

From colonies to independence

The Canadian monarchy can trace its ancestral lineage back to the kings of the Angles and the early Scottish kings and through the centuries since the claims of King Henry VII in 1497 and King Francis I in 1534; both being blood relatives of the current Canadian monarch. Former Prime Minister Stephen Harper said of the Crown that it "links us all together with the majestic past that takes us back to the Tudors, the Plantagenets, Magna Carta, habeas corpus, petition of rights, and English common law." Though the first French and British colonizers of Canada interpreted the hereditary nature of some indigenous North American chieftainships as a form of monarchy, it is generally accepted that Canada has been a territory of a monarch or a monarchy in its own right only since the establishment of the French colony of Canada in the early 16th century; according to historian Jacques Monet, the Canadian Crown is one of the few that have survived through uninterrupted succession since before its inception.

After the Canadian colonies of France were, via war and treaties, ceded to the British Crown, and the population was greatly expanded by those loyal to George III fleeing north from persecution during and following the American Revolution, British North America was in 1867 confederated by Queen Victoria to form Canada as a kingdom in its own right. By the end of the First World War, the increased fortitude of Canadian nationalism inspired the country's leaders to push for greater independence from the King in his British Council, resulting in the creation of the uniquely Canadian monarchy through the Statute of Westminster, which was granted royal assent in 1931. Only five years later, Canada had three successive kings in the space of one year, with the death of George V, the accession and abdication of Edward VIII, and his replacement by George VI.

From 1786 through to the 1930s, members of the royal family toured Canada, including Prince William (later King William IV); Prince Edward, Duke of Kent; Prince Albert Edward, Prince of Wales (later King Edward VII); Prince Arthur, Duke of Connaught and Strathearn; John Campbell, Marquess of Lorne, and Princess Louise; Prince Leopold; Princess Marie-Louise; Prince George, Duke of Cornwall and York (later King George V), and Princess Victoria (later Queen Mary); Prince Arthur (son of the Duke of Connaught); Princess Patricia; Prince Albert (later King George VI); Prince Edward, Prince of Wales (later King Edward VIII); Prince George, Duke of Kent; and Prince Henry, Duke of Gloucester.

The Canadian Crown

King George VI became in 1939 the first reigning monarch of Canada to tour the country, doing so with his wife, Queen Elizabeth. Only weeks later, the King, on the advice of his Canadian Prime Minister, declared war on Nazi Germany. Throughout the conflict, George boosted the morale of his Canadian troops while Governor General the Earl of Athlone (the King's uncle) supported the war effort in Canada. The men were occasionally assisted in their efforts by other members of the royal family.

Elizabeth II undertook her first tour of Canada in 1951, when Princess Elizabeth, Duchess of Edinburgh. She would go on to officiate at various moments of importance in the nation's history: She opened Parliament in 1957—on the same tour, delivering, from Rideau Hall, her first-ever live television broadcast—and in 1977; opened the St Lawrence Seaway in 1959; celebrated Canada's centennial; and proclaimed the country to be fully independent, via constitutional patriation, in 1982. That act is said to have entrenched the monarchy in Canada, due to the stringent amending formula that must be followed in order to alter the monarchy in any way.

Through the 1960s and 1970s, the rise of Quebec nationalism and changes in Canadian identity created an atmosphere where the purpose and role of the monarchy came into question. Some references to the monarch and the monarchy were removed from the public eye and moves were made by the federal government to constitutionally alter the Crown's place and role in Canada, first by explicit legal amendments and later by subtle attrition. But, provincial and federal ministers, along with loyal national citizen's organizations, ensured that the system remained the same in essence.

The Queen publicly expressed her personal support for the Meech Lake Accord, which attempted to bring Quebec governmental support to the patriated constitution. The accord failed, prompting Elizabeth to deliver a nationally-broadcast speech in Ottawa supporting Canadian unity. In the lead-up to the referendum on Quebec independence in 1995, the Queen was tricked by a Montreal radio DJ into revealing her desire to see the "no" side win, offering to help however she could. Elizabeth followed the results closely on the day of the vote.

Members of the royal family continued to be present at important national events through the decades: the Queen in 1970, 1971, and 1973, respectively, marked the anniversaries of Manitoba, British Columbia, and Prince Edward Island becoming Canadian provinces; celebrated Ontario's and New Brunswick's bicentennials in 1984 and the 125th anniversary of Confederation in 1992; and she opened the 1976 Summer Olympics in Montreal and Nunavut's parliament in 1999. Prince Charles, Prince of Wales, attended the 100th anniversary of Treaty 7 in 1977; commemorated in 1983 the bicentennial of United Empire Loyalists settling in New Brunswick and Nova Scotia; and, with Diana, Princess of Wales, opened Expo 86 in Vancouver. Between them, the Queen and her family opened numerous Commonwealth Games, Commonwealth Heads of Government Meetings, conferences, hospitals, community centres, and the like; handed out The Duke of Edinburgh Awards at ceremonies across the country, and visited many regiments and branches of the Canadian Armed Forces.

The 21st century

By 2002, the royal tour and associated fêtes for the Queen's Golden Jubilee proved popular with Canadians across the country, though Canada's first republican organization since the 1830s was also founded that year. Celebrations took place across the country to mark the Queen's Diamond Jubilee in 2012, the first such event in Canada since that for Victoria in 1897. On 9 September 2015, she became the second-longest reigning monarch in Canadian history (preceded only by King Louis XIV); events were organized to celebrate her as the "longest-reigning sovereign in Canada's modern era." Prince Charles represented his mother, the Queen, two years later, at the main events in Ottawa recognizing the 150th anniversary of Confederation.

During the COVID-19 pandemic, the Queen expressed her support for all Canadians and thanks to those who were caring for the vulnerable and providing essential services. As the pandemic waned into 2022, celebrations were mounted around the country and throughout the year to mark the Queen's Platinum Jubilee; the first-ever such event in Canadian history. It was also, though, the first time since at least Queen Victoria's Golden Jubilee in 1887 that the federal Cabinet did not advise the Crown to create an associated medal. In response, six provinces produced their own Platinum Jubilee medals; another first.

The subject of reconciliation with Canada's indigenous peoples came to the forefront of the public consciousness in 2021, particularly in regard to residential schools. Statues of Queen Victoria and Queen Elizabeth II in Winnipeg were vandalized. On the first National Day for Truth and Reconciliation, Elizabeth made a public statement, saying she "joins with all Canadians [...] to reflect on the painful history that indigenous peoples endured in residential schools in Canada and on the work that remains to heal and to continue to build an inclusive society." In the same year, the Queen appointed Mary Simon as the first indigenous governor general in Canadian history. During Prince Charles' tour for his mother's Platinum Jubilee, "there [was] no shying away from acknowledging and highlighting the scandalous way many indigenous peoples have been treated in Canada."

Past the second Elizabethan era
Queen Elizabeth II passed away on 8 September 2022 and was succeeded by her eldest son, who took the regnal name Charles III. The Queen's last public message was sent on 7 September to Canadians across the country, in the aftermath of the 2022 Saskatchewan stabbings. stating in it she "mourn[s] with all Canadians at this tragic time". Immediately following a formal meeting of the King's Privy Council for Canada, the proclamation of the new king took place on 10 September, in a ceremony at Rideau Hall that included heraldic trumpeting, a 21-gun salute, and a moment of remembrance for Queen Elizabeth II. Elizabeth reigned for almost half of Canada's history since Confederation, being only the sixth Canadian monarch since 1867.

Public understanding

Commentators have in the late 20th and early 21st centuries stated that contemporary Canadians had and have a poor understanding of the Canadian monarchy; something the Monarchist League of Canada (MLC) claims opponents of the monarchy exacerbate by spreading disinformation and then take advantage of. Michael D Jackson wrote in his book, The Crown and Canadian Federalism, that this is part of a wider ignorance about Canadian civics and, while David Smith researched for his 1995 book, The Invisible Crown, he found it difficult to "find anyone who could talk knowledgeably about the subject". Former Governor General Adrienne Clarkson said there is "an abysmal lack of knowledge about the system" and Senator Lowell Murray wrote in 2003: "The Crown has become irrelevant to most Canadians' understanding of our system of Government", which he attributed to the "fault of successive generations of politicians, of an educational system that has never given the institution due study, and of past viceregal incumbents themselves". The issue is particularly acute in Quebec, where sovereigntist politicians deliberately misrepresent the Canadian monarchy as something foreign and, consequently, as symbol of oppression; Université du Québec à Chicoutimi professor Gérard Bouchard said, "in Quebec, the majority of people would say, 'we don't know why this [the monarchy] continues in Canada and we don't know why this has been imposed on us in Quebec.'"

These comments were echoed by teacher and author Nathan Tidridge, who asserted that, beginning in the 1960s, the role of the Crown disappeared from provincial education curricula, as the general subject of civics came to receive less attention. He said Canadians are being "educated to be illiterate, ambivalent, or even hostile toward our constitutional monarchy". The MLC agreed, stating Canada has "an educational system which unfortunately often fails to provide comprehensive knowledge of Canada’s constitution." Michael Valpy also pointed to the fact that "The crown's role in the machinery of Canada's constitutional monarchy rarely sees daylight. Only a handful of times in our history has it been subjected to glaring sunshine, unfortunately resulting in a black hole of public understanding as to how it works." He later iterated: "the public's attention span on the constitutional intricacies of the monarchy is clinically short".

John Pepall argued in 1990 that a "Liberal-inspired republican misconception of the role" of governor general had taken root, though the Conservative government headed by Brian Mulroney exacerbated the matter. The position of prime minister has simultaneously undergone, with encouragement from its occupants, what has been described as a "presidentialization", to the point that its incumbents publicly outshine the actual head of state. Additionally, it has been theorized the monarchy is so prevalent in Canada—by way of all manner of symbols, place names, royal tours, etc.—that Canadians fail to take note of it; the monarchy "functions like a tasteful wallpaper pattern in Canada: enjoyable in an absent-minded way, but so ubiquitous as to be almost invisible".

David S. Donovan feels that Canadians mostly consider the monarch and her representatives as purely ceremonial and symbolic figures. It was argued by Alfred Neitsch that this undermined the Crown's legitimacy as a check and balance in the governmental system, a situation Helen Forsey (daughter of Canadian constitutional expert Eugene Forsey) said prime ministers take advantage of, portraying themselves as the embodiment of popular democracy and the reserve powers of the Crown as illegitimate.

In the 2010s, a "growing interest in the Crown and its prerogatives" was observed, as evidenced by "a burst of articles, books and conferences". This was attributed to the coincidental occurrence of publicly prominent events over a number of years, including the 2008 prorogation dispute; an increased use of royal symbols as directed by the Cabinet while headed by Stephen Harper, including two consecutive royal tours; court cases focusing on the Oath of Citizenship; and increasingly active governors. Smith and Philippe Lagassé noted in early 2016 that post-secondary students were giving more focus to the subject of the Crown.

At the end of Elizabeth II's reign, there were some assertions by activists and in the media that the monarchy and the Queen herself represented colonialism and racism and she did not do enough to either prevent or rectify supposed offences. Those who made such claims also, though, mistook the independent Canadian Crown as the British Crown in Canada and demonstrated a misunderstanding of decolonization, the Crown-indigenous peoples relationship, and the workings of constitutional monarchy and responsible government, in which the sovereign must, outside of constitutional crises, follow the directions of her ministers and parliamentarians. Some in the media echoed these fallacies by asking the British government to comment on the vandalization of statues of Queen Victoria and Queen Elizabeth II in Winnipeg. Similarly, the leader of the Parti Québécois, Paul St-Pierre Plamondon, claimed in 2022, "we cannot overlook that she [Queen Elizabeth II] represented an institution, the British crown, that has caused significant harm to Quebecers and Indigenous nations."

Within Quebec, too, the Canadian Crown is frequently misrepresented as the British Crown and that false foreignness used in political, particularly sovereigntist, discourse as an argument in favour of extracting the Crown from Quebec or Quebec from Canada. For instance, in the televised Radio-Canada leaders’ debate on 22 September 2022, during that year's general election in the province, the moderator, Patrice Roy, asked the panel, with "incredulous chuckles", "should we still, in Quebec, swear allegiance to the British Crown , thus Charles III [to take one's seat in the National Assembly]?" Bloc Québécois leader Yves-François Blanchet on 26 October 2022 tabled a motion in the House of Commons proposing that the "House express its desire to sever ties [sic] between the Canadian state and the British monarchy [sic]."

Debate 

Outside of academic circles, there has been little national debate on the monarchy. The position of monarch in Canada is highly protected by the Constitution Act, 1982—which mandates that any major constitutional amendment, such as any change to the monarchy, must receive unanimous consent of the Senate, the House of Commons, and all ten provincial legisltive assemblies—and treaties between the Crown and indigenous peoples that play a role in entrenching the monarchy.

Canada has two special-interest groups representing the debate, who occasionally argue the issue in the media: the Monarchist League of Canada (MLC) and Citizens for a Canadian Republic. There are also other organizations that support and advocate the monarchy, such as the Institute for the Study of the Crown in Canada, the Canadian Royal Heritage Trust, the Friends of the Canadian Crown, Canadian Friends of the Royal Family, the Société de la Couronne du Canada, the Orange Order in Canada, and the United Empire Loyalists' Association of Canada.

Out of Canada's four most prominent political parties, neither the Liberal Party nor the Conservative Party are officially in favour of abolishing the monarchy (the Conservative Party cite support for constitutional monarchy as a founding principle in its policy declaration) and the New Democratic Party has no official position on the role of the Crown. Only some members of Parliament belonging to these parties and the leaders of the Bloc Québécois have made any statements suggesting abolition of the monarchy.

Opinion polls on the Canadian monarchy have been regularly conducted since the 1990s. An analysis of these polls in 2008 highlighted an increased disaffection with the monarchy, albeit with internal contradictions in specific polling results, with some criticizing the polling questions for using "inconsistent and sometimes ambiguous wording." Questions often describe the monarch or monarchy as "British", terminology at odds with the contemporary situation in Canada, wherein the monarchy is a Canadian institution, separate from that of the United Kingdom, and it, the Crown, and royal family are referred to as Canadian. Both monarchists and republicans agree the populace's general lack of understanding about the monarchy affects opinions.

The idea of a uniquely Canadian monarch, either one descended from the House of Windsor or coming from a First Nations royal house, has been proffered as an alternative. Some Canadian monarchists have even suggested that all the Commonwealth realms should have their own resident monarchs. However, there has been no popular or official support for such a change.

In popular culture

The television series Rideau Hall, starring Bette MacDonald, was produced by the Canadian Broadcasting Corporation and aired for one season in 2002. Its premise was a brash, one-hit wonder disco artist being appointed governor general on the advice of a republican prime minister.

Canadian comedian Scott Thompson regularly played a parody of Queen Elizabeth II in a Canadian context on the sketch comedy television show The Kids in the Hall, as well as in other productions, such as The Queen's Toast: A Royal Wedding Special and Conan. Thompson also voiced a portrayal of Queen Elizabeth II in Canada in the animated television show Fugget About It, in the episode "Royally Screwed".

The Canadian monarchy was parodied in "Royal Pudding", the third episode of the 15th season of the animated television show South Park, which first aired on 11 May 2011. The opening focuses on a spoof of the wedding of Prince William and Catherine Middleton, featuring caricatures of Queen Elizabeth II; Prince William, Prince of Wales; and Catherine, Princess of Wales. Specific mention is made of "the Queen of Canada" and "the Canadian royal family". The show subsequently, in the second episode of the 26th season, "The Worldwide Privacy Tour", parodied the Duke and Duchess of Sussex as a prince of Canada and "the wife", who, after hostile treatment at the funeral of the late Queen of Canada, go on national television and a world tour demanding people and the media not pay attention to them and branding themselves as victims.

See also

 List of monarchies
 Monarchies in the Americas
 Royal and viceroyal transport in Canada
 Royal eponyms in Canada
 States headed by Elizabeth II
 The Canadian Crown and Indigenous peoples of Canada
 The Canadian Crown and the Canadian Armed Forces

Notes

References

Citations

Sources

Further information
Reading

 
 
 
 
 MacKinnon, Frank (1976). The Crown in Canada. Calgary, Alta.: Glenbow-Alberta Institute: McClelland and Stewart West. 189 p.  pbk
 
 
 
 
 
 
 
 

Viewing

External links

 Government of Canada: Monarchy and the Crown
 The Canadian Encyclopedia: Constitutional monarchy
 The Canadian Encyclopedia: Crown
 The Canadian Encyclopedia: Sovereign
 Institute for the Study of the Crown in Canada
 Monarchist League of Canada: Our Monarchy

 
Government of Canada
Government in Canada
Parliament of Canada
Heads of state of Canada
Legal history of Canada
Canada
Canadian heraldry
Canadian identity